Future Deep is Juliette Lewis's first non-single release since the 2009 album Terra Incognita.

Future Deep could be considered a culmination of everything Lewis has been doing musically over a seven-year period (2009-2016). "Any Way You Want" was previously released as a single in September 2016. The same is true of the EP's fifth track, "Hello Hero", which was released in April 2016. Lewis added five new songs.

The EP is co-written and co-produced by Lewis along with Isabella Summers of  Florence and the Machine, Brad Shultz, Jared Champion and Matthan Minster from Cage the Elephant.
 
At the time of release, Lewis was starring in the second season of ABC's crime thriller Secrets and Lies.

Track listing

Personnel
Juliette Lewis - Vocals
Isabella Summers - Producer tracks: 5 to 7, Keyboards tracks: 5 to 7
Brad Shultz - Producer tracks: 1 to 4, Guitar tracks: 1 to 4
Matthan Minster  - Bass, Keyboards, Vocals, Percussion (tracks: 1 to 4)
Denny Weston - Drums – (tracks: 5 to 7)
Jared Champion - Drums – (tracks: 1 to 4)
Chris Wonzer - Engineer – (tracks: 5 to 7)
Jason Hall - Engineer, Mixing (tracks: 1 to 4)
James Walbourne - Guitar – (tracks: 7)
Ron McElroy - Guitar – (tracks: 6)
Todd Morse - Guitar – (tracks: 5)
Ali Helnwein - Strings - (tracks: 7)
Paul Ill - Bass – (tracks: 5 to 7)
Jason LaRocca - Mastered By

References 

Juliette Lewis EPs
2017 EPs